André Julien may refer to:
 André Julien Chainat (1892–1961), French World War I flying ace
 André Julien, Comte Dupuy (1753–?), Governor General of French India, 1816–1825

See also 
 André Jullien (1766–1832), French wine writer
 André-Damien-Ferdinand Jullien (1882–1964), French cardinal